Naruhisa (written: 稔久 or 成久) is a masculine Japanese given name. Notable people with the name include:

 (born 1964), Japanese screenwriter
 (1887–1923), Japanese prince

Japanese masculine given names